Ingeborg Cornelius (born 1930) is an Austrian stage and film actress. She appeared in a number of heimatfilm during the 1950s, having been discovered by the producer Peter Ostermayr.

Selected filmography
 The Violin Maker of Mittenwald (1950)
 The Cloister of Martins (1951)
 The Crucifix Carver of Ammergau (1952)
 The Double Husband (1955)
 Marriages Forbidden (1957)

References

Bibliography
 Goble, Alan. The Complete Index to Literary Sources in Film. Walter de Gruyter, 1999.

External links

1930 births
Living people
Austrian stage actresses
Austrian film actresses
Actresses from Vienna